Tannoy is a British manufacturer of loudspeakers and public address systems. Founded by Guy Fountain in London in 1926 as the Tulsemere Manufacturing Company, today the company is part of the Music Tribe group of brands.

History
Tannoy Ltd is a British manufacturer of loudspeakers and public address (PA) systems. The company was founded by Guy Fountain in London, England, as Tulsemere Manufacturing Company in 1926, and moved to Coatbridge, Scotland in the 1970s.

Tannoy's image is particularly linked to both studio monitors as well as its Prestige range of home speakers. Prestige speakers use Dual Concentric cone speakers and are easily recognisable by their "vintage" design. Tannoy is notable for its 'Dual Concentric' speaker design, which places the tweeter behind the centre of the medium or bass driver. "Dual Concentric" is a trademark although Tannoy is not the only speaker manufacturer to design coaxial speakers.

In 2002, Tannoy was acquired by TC Group, and TC Group was subsequently acquired by Music Group in 2015. Following the Music Group acquisition, it was suggested that the Coatbridge facility would be closed and all related activities would be relocated to Manchester, England. In 2016, however, Music Group confirmed that Tannoy loudspeaker manufacturing would continue in Scotland, with a brand new manufacturing facility planned.

Brand name

The name Tannoy is a syllabic abbreviation of tantalum alloy, which was the material used in a type of electrolytic rectifier developed by the company. The brand was trademarked by 10 March 1932, on which date the Tulsemere Manufacturing Company formally registered as Guy R. Fountain Limited.

Tannoy became a household name as a result of supplying PA systems to the armed forces during World War II, and to Butlins and Pontins holiday camps after the war, each speaker having the Tannoy logo prominently displayed on the speaker grills. As a result, the term "tannoy" is used in British English for any public-address system, and as a verb, to "tannoy", for making an announcement in a public place. That is, although Tannoy is a registered trademark, it is still often used generically. Because of this, the company's intellectual property department keeps a close eye on the media. To preserve its trademark, it often notifies publications not to use its trade name without a capital letter, or as a generic term for a PA system.

Products

Home and Studio speakers:
 Reveal Series (Made in China)
 Plus Series
 70Anniversary Series
 Surrey Series
 Gold Series
 Definition Series
 Eclipse Series
 Mercury Series
 Prestige Series
 Classic Monitor
 K3838 monitor kit (similar to Classic Monitor)
 Super Red Monitor
 K3808 monitor kit (similar to Super Red Monitor)
 Little Red
 Sixes Series
 Profile Series
 Precision Series
 Revolution Series
 Dimension Series
 Eyris Series
 Arena 5.1

Cabinets:
 Lancaster
 System DMT

PA Systems:
 Wildcats (1984)
 CPA Series (1990)
 T & I Series (1998)
 B Series (1998)
 V Series (2002)
 VS Series (2003)
 IQ Series (2004)
 VQ & VQNET Series (2009)
 VX & VXP Series (2011)
 VSX Series (2012)
 VSXNET (2015)

Further reading

See also 
 List of studio monitor manufacturers

References

External links

 Tannoy worldwide homepage
 Tannoy Monitor Gold website
 Tannoy Dual Concentric website

Loudspeaker manufacturers
Electronics companies established in 1926
Manufacturers of professional audio equipment
Manufacturing companies of Scotland
British brands
1926 establishments in England
Audio equipment manufacturers of the United Kingdom